The West Northwall Firn was a glacial body on Mount Carstensz in the Sudirman Range on the island of New Guinea in Central Papua province, Indonesia.

Sometime between 1936 and 1962, a single Northwall Firn split into several separate glaciers, the largest being the West Northwall Firn and the East Northwall Firn. Research presented in 2004 of IKONOS satellite imagery of the New Guinean glaciers indicated that in the two years from 2000 to 2002, the West Northwall Firn had lost a further 19.4% of its surface area. The glacial ice on Puncak Jaya was found to be about 32 meters (105 feet) thick and thinning at a rate of 7 meters (23 feet) per year during an expedition there in 2010. At that rate, the remaining glaciers in the immediate region near Puncak Jaya were expected to last only to the year 2015. Indeed, in or before 2017, the West Northwall Firn had completely disappeared.

At least one previous icecap also existed in the region between 15,000 and 7,000 years ago, when it also apparently melted away and disappeared.

See also
Retreat of glaciers since 1850
List of glaciers

References

Glaciers of Western New Guinea